Caio Couto Gonçalves (born 29 January 1976), known as Caio Couto, is a Brazilian football coach. He is the current head coach of Audax Rio.

Career
Born in Rio de Janeiro, Couto started his career with Flamengo, staying at the club until the under-17 category. He subsequently moved to Botafogo after a short stint with São Cristóvão, and finished his formation with Fluminense, where he started his senior career. He also played for Anapolina and Desportiva as a senior before retiring.

Shortly after retiring, Couto started working as a manager at América de Natal's youth categories. He was subsequently in charge of Tigres do Brasil's under-20 squad, Botafogo's under-13 squad and Fluminense's under-15 squad before being named manager of the Brazil women's under-20 team in 2011.

In March 2012, Couto was named manager of Vitória das Tabocas' women's team, leading the club to the semifinals of the 2012 Copa do Brasil de Futebol Feminino. On 21 November of the following year, he was appointed manager of the men's team, but resigned on 29 January 2014, after 18 points in 14 matches of the 2014 Campeonato Pernambucano.

Couto took over Quissamã in February 2014, and was subsequently presented in charge of Bonsucesso on 21 July of that year. He was sacked by the latter in February 2015, and was named manager of Santos' women's team in March.

Couto won the 2017 Campeonato Brasileiro de Futebol Feminino Série A1 with Peixe, but was still dismissed on 14 January 2018. On 11 February 2019, he returned to men's football after being named manager of Campeonato Paulista Segunda Divisão side Jaguariúna FC, but resigned on 24 April.

In February, after Lopes resigned, he was named the head coach.

Honours
Brazil U20
South American U-20 Women's Championship: 2012

Vitória das Tabocas (women)
Campeonato Pernambucano de Futebol Feminino: 2012

Santos
Campeonato Brasileiro de Futebol Feminino Série A1: 2017

References

External links

1976 births
Living people
Footballers from Rio de Janeiro (city)
Brazilian footballers
Association football defenders
Fluminense FC players
Associação Atlética Anapolina players
Desportiva Ferroviária players
Brazilian football managers
Bonsucesso Futebol Clube managers
Santos FC (women) managers
Audax Rio de Janeiro Esporte Clube managers